The Siadar Wave Power Station (also known as Siadar Wave Energy Project or SWEP) was a proposed 4 MW wave farm  off the shore of Siadar Bay, in Lewis, Scotland.  The £30 million project, was to be built by Wavegen, received Scottish Government approval on 22 January 2009. Originally, the project was developed in cooperation with npower Renewables. However, in August 2011, npower Renewables left the project. In 2012 project was cancelled.

The wave station was proposed to be based on oscillating water column technology.  A  causeway will be constructed, and a breakwater with 10 concrete caissons, containing 36 to 40 Wells turbines, placed on the seabed.

See also

Wave Energy
Renewable energy in Scotland
European Marine Energy Centre
Aegir wave farm
Pelamis Wave Power
Aquamarine Power

References

External links
Siadar Wave Power Scheme at npower renewables 
npower submit plans for wave power scheme at Wavegen
Siadar Bay Wave Energy Project at renewableenergydev.com

2011 in Scotland
Isle of Lewis
Buildings and structures in the Outer Hebrides
Wave farms in Scotland
Proposed renewable energy power stations in Scotland